The Argentina U-17 women's national football team represents Argentina in international U-17 women's football. Is the representative in all FIFA sponsored tournaments that pertain to that category. The national team has never qualified to a FIFA U-17 Women's World Cup.

Results and fixtures

The following is a list of recent match results, as well as any future matches that have been scheduled.
Legend

Players

Current squad
The following players were called up for the xxxx tournament on 9 September 2021.

Caps and goals accurate up to and including 9 September 2021.

Competitive record
 Champions   Runners-up   Third place   Fourth place

FIFA U-17 Women's World Cup

South American Under-17 Women's Football Championship

See also
Argentina women's national football team
Argentina women's national under-20 football team
Sport in Argentina
Football in Argentina
Women's football in Argentina
Argentina–Brazil football rivalry

References

Argentina women's national football team
Women's national under-17 association football teams
Youth football in Argentina